Holmesville is an unincorporated community and census-designated place (CDP) in Gage County, Nebraska, United States. As of the 2010 census it had a population of 51.

History
Holmesville got its start in the year 1880, following construction of the railroad through the territory. It was named for its postmaster, Morgan L. Holmes.

Geography
Holmesville is in central Gage County, on the east side of the Big Blue River, a south-flowing tributary of the Kansas River.

Demographics

References

Census-designated places in Gage County, Nebraska